MTV Rock On, or Rock On with MTV, is a television show hosted on MTV India.
This show is a platform for musicians in India.

Hosts
The first season was hosted by VJ's Ayushmann and Anusha Dandekar.
and the second season by Lisa Haydon and VJ Ayushmann.

Judges
Judges were Singer and Composer Kailash Kher, Ram Sampath and VJ Nikhil for Season 1.
Bollywood music director Pritam and Indian Ocean (band) bassist Rahul Ram were judges of Season 2.

Results
Season 1:
Winners: Saadhak led by Nirdosh Sobti
Runners Up: Khilaugh led by Rahi Chakraborty

Season 2: 
Winners: Divine Connection
Runners Up: Kaivalyaa

Format
Season one auditioned individual musicians but the second season saw more band auditions.

References

External links 
 https://web.archive.org/web/20101130105549/http://mtv.in.com/RockOn
 http://www.kailashkher.com
 http://www.indianocean.com
 https://web.archive.org/web/20110204001327/http://rahichakraborty.com/
 

MTV (Indian TV channel) original programming
Indian reality television series
2009 Indian television series debuts
2010 Indian television series endings
Indian music television series